Galerie St. Etienne is an Expressionism art gallery operating in the United States, founded in Vienna in 1923 by Otto Kallir (originally Otto Nirenstein) as the Neue Galerie. Forced to leave Austria after the 1938 Nazi invasion, Kallir established his gallery in Paris as the Galerie St. Etienne, named after the Neue Galerie's location near Vienna's Cathedral of St. Stephen. In 1939, Kallir and his family left France for the United States, where he reestablished the Galerie St. Etienne on 46 West 57th Street in New York City. The gallery still exists, run by Otto Kallir's granddaughter Jane and Hildegard Bachert on 24 West 57th Street. It maintains a reputation as a principal harbinger of Austrian and German Expressionism to the US.

Vienna
Deciding to pursue his interest in art instead of his childhood passion for aeronautics,
Kallir joined the Galerie Würthle, a leading art gallery in Vienna, in 1919. In 1923, Kallir established his own gallery, the Neue Galerie, for which the New York museum of Austrian and German art and design was later named. The gallery opened with the first major posthumous exhibition of Egon Schiele's work, and continued to represent artists such as Gustav Klimt, Oskar Kokoschka, Egon Schiele, Richard Gerstl and Alfred Kubin. In addition to the work of Austrian artists, Kallir brought international figures like Vincent van Gogh, Paul Signac, Auguste Renoir and Paul Cézanne to the gallery. Kallir also published limited edition prints by artists like Max Beckmann, Johannes Itten, Oskar Kokoschka and Alfred Kubin, and most notably a portfolio of Egon Schiele's etchings and lithographs, Das Graphische Werk von Egon Schiele, continuing to utilize the publishing skills he developed early in his career.

The Anschluss and its aftermath
After the Nazi annexation of Austria in 1938, Kallir faced persecution not only for being Jewish, but for supporting the Schuschnigg government. He sold the Neue Galerie to his secretary, Vita Kūnstler, who preserved the gallery as best she could and voluntarily returned it to Kallir after World War II. Because work by the modern artists the gallery represented was not subject to Austria's export laws and was in most cases, considered by the Nazis to be "degenerate", Kallir was able to bring a significant portion of the gallery's inventory with him into exile. Kallir and his family initially emigrated to Lucerne, Switzerland, but Kallir traveled to Paris, where he founded the Galerie St. Etienne, when he was not granted a Swiss work permit. Since the French would not admit his wife and two children, the Kallir family emigrated to the United States in 1939, where he founded the Galerie St. Etienne in New York.

America
After emigrating to the United States, Kallir established New York's Galerie St. Etienne and helped introduce Expressionism to this country. The Galerie St. Etienne hosted the first American exhibitions of numerous important Austrian and German modernists in the 1940s and 1950s, including Gustav Klimt, Oskar Kokoschka, Alfred Kubin, Paula Modersohn-Becker, Käthe Kollwitz and Egon Schiele. Through shows, sales, scholarship, and gifts to museums such as the Solomon R. Guggenheim Museum, the Museum of Modern Art, and the Minneapolis Institute of Arts, Kallir and the Galerie St. Etienne established a place in the American eye for Austrian and German expressionism.

The Galerie St. Etienne began representing the work of American folk artists as it attempted to capture the identity of its newfound homeland. In 1940, the Galerie St. Etienne hosted the first one-woman exhibition of the work of Anna Mary Robertson ("Grandma") Moses.

The gallery gained the exclusive representation of Grandma Moses, who became one of the most renowned American artists of the immediate postwar era, in large part thanks to a relationship cultivated by Hildegard Bachert, the gallery's co-director since Kallir's death in 1978.

In 1941, the gallery exhibited Navajo and Hopi weavings, as Kallir aimed to exhibit art reflective of American identity.

The gallery expanded to represent the work of artists like Henry Darger, John Kane, Ilija Bosilj, Michel Nedjar and the Artists of the Gugging. It also maintained its long tradition of outstanding scholarship, beginning with the first catalogue raisonné of Egon Schiele's paintings, Egon Schiele: Persönlichkeit und Werke, published by Otto Kallir in 1930. Kallir published an update to his 1930 Schiele catalogue raisonné in 1966, and a catalogue raisonné of the artist's prints, Egon Schiele: The Graphic Work, in 1970.

In addition, Kallir authored catalogue raisonnés documenting the work of Grandma Moses (1973) and Richard Gerstl (1974).

Controversies concerning Nazi looted art and forced sales 
In 1998, artworks by Egon Schiele that had been sold by Kallir to the Austrian collector Dr. Leopold came under scrutiny when the heirs of  Fritz Grünbaum, a Jewish collector who had been persecuted and murdered during the Holocaust, filed claims for their restitution. 

In 2009, a Kokoschka artwork, Two Nudes, that Kallir had sold to another dealer, was the object of a court battle between the heirs of Dr. Oskar Reichel and the Museum of Fine Arts, Boston.

In 2019, a judge ruled in favor or Grünbaum's heirs in a lawsuit concerning the return of two Egon Schiele drawings, Woman Hiding her Face (1912) and Woman in a Black Pinafore (1911), both of which had passed through Kallir.

Today
Upon Kallir's death in 1978, the Galerie St. Etienne was taken over by long-time associate, Hildegard Bachert, and Kallir's granddaughter, Jane Kallir. It continues today under their directorship.

Under the direction of Kallir and Bachert, the Galerie St. Etienne began a program of museum-scale loan exhibitions, a practice then uncommon among museum galleries.

These shows were routinely accompanied by book-length catalogues published by trade publishers, which was also unusual at the time (see Publications for further information). Lenders included the Museum of Fine Arts, Boston, the Art Institute of Chicago, the Solomon R. Guggenheim Museum, the Metropolitan Museum of Art, the Museum of Modern Art, the Whitney Museum of American Art, the Hirshhorn Museum and Sculpture Garden, the Phillips Collection, the Kunsthalle Bremen, the Lenbachhaus in Munich, the National Gallery of Canada in Ottawa, the Wien Museum and the Belvedere in Vienna, plus many private collectors. While the gallery still maintains its historical orientation, the major exception is its representation of the work of contemporary British-born artist Sue Coe, whose oeuvre shares close formal and thematic connections with the work of Käthe Kollwitz. The gallery also represents the estate of the American artist Leonard Baskin.

The gallery presents three major exhibitions each year, all of which are accompanied by a scholarly essay written by Jane Kallir. Kallir also publishes an annual “Art Market Report,” timed to coincide with Art Basel in June.

The gallery is a member of the Art Dealers Association of America and participates in the Winter Antiques Show, the ADAA Art Show, and the IFPDA Print Fair (all in New York) and Art Basel (in Basel, Switzerland).

Both Kallir and Bachert have been honored with various awards for their contributions to Austrian and German cultural preservation, and the gallery has received awards for its contributions to the Bennington Museum, which is known for its Grandma Moses collection.

Kallir and Bachert continue to contribute to scholarship on the artists represented by the gallery, authoring essays that have been included in numerous exhibition publications. In addition to the gallery's academic contributions, the Galerie St. Etienne has played a role in many Holocaust-era restitution cases, most notably, the 1997–2010 case documenting Egon Schiele's Portrait of Wally.

The gallery provides authentications and appraisals on works that fall under its purview, and is committed to working with internationally recognized researchers on updating the provenance of said works.

Publications
The following publications are associated with the gallery:

 Egon Schiele: Oeuvre Catalogue of the Paintings (Crown Publishers, New York: 1966)
 Egon Schiele; The Graphic Work (Crown, New York: 1970)
 Grandma Moses (Abrams: New York: 1973)
 Richard Gerstl (1883-1908): Beitrāge zur Dokumentation seines Lebens und Werkes (Counsel Press: New York, 1974)
 Gustav Klimt/Egon Schiele (New York: Crown Publishers, 1980)
 Austria's Expressionism (New York: Rizzoli International, 1981)
 The Folk Art Tradition: Naive Painting in Europe and the United States (New York: The Viking Press, 1981)
 Grandma Moses: The Artist Behind the Myth (New York: Clarkson N. Potter, 1982)
 Arnold Schoenberg's Vienna (New York: Rizzoli International, 1984)
 Viennese Design and the Wiener Werkstätte (New York: George Braziller, Inc., 1986)
 Gustav Klimt: 25 Masterworks (New York: Harry N. Abrams, Inc., 1989)
 Egon Schiele: The Complete Works – Including a Biography and a Catalogue Raisonné (New York: Harry N. Abrams, Inc., 1990; expanded edition 1998)
 Egon Schiele (New York: Harry N. Abrams, Inc. 1994)
 Egon Schiele: 27 Masterworks (New York: Harry N. Abrams, Inc., 1996)
 Grandma Moses: 25 Masterworks (New York: Harry N. Abrams, Inc., 1997)
 Grandma Moses in the 21st Century (New Haven: Yale University Press, 2001 
 The Essential Grandma Moses (New York: Harry N. Abrams, Inc., 2001)
 Egon Schiele: Life and Work (New York: Harry N. Abrams, Inc., 2003)
 Egon Schiele: Drawings and Watercolors (London: Thames & Hudson, 2003)
 Egon Schiele: Love and Death (Amsterdam: Van Gogh Museum & Hatje Cantz: 2005)
 Egon Schiele: Erotica (Paris: Éditions Anthèse: 2007)
 Gustav Klimt: In Search of the Total Artwork (Munich: Prestel Verlag, 2009)
 Egon Schiele: Self-Portraits and Portraits (Munich: Prestel Verlag, 2011)
 Egon Schiele's Women (Munich: Prestel Verlag, 2012)
 The Women of Klimt, Schiele and Kokoschka (Munich: Prestel Verlag, 2015)

References

1923 establishments in Austria
57th Street (Manhattan)
Art galleries established in 1923
Art museums and galleries in Manhattan
Art museums and galleries in Paris
Art museums and galleries in Vienna
Contemporary art galleries in the United States
Defunct art museums and galleries in Austria
Defunct art museums and galleries in Paris
Expressionism
Midtown Manhattan